Čemernica is a mountain in Central Bosnia, surrounded by the river Vrbas, and its confluences of Ugar and Vrbanja river.  The highest peak of Čemernica rises to an altitude of 1,338 meters. It is located south of Banja Luka, in the areas which connect the municipalities of Mrkonjić Grad, Skender Vakuf and Banja Luka. In its foothills are the cities of Kotor Varoš (in the northeast) and Skender Vakuf (in the east), as well as the settlement of Bočac (in the west). Under its northern slopes there is hydroelectric power plant reservoir of "Bočac".

Along its southern slopes passes the regional road from Banja Luka to  Travnik, as well as its branch from Skender Vakuf to Imljani and Korićani (via Ilomska).

Čemernica is the source of many rivers, streams and creeks, and the largest waterways are Cvrcka and Jakotina. The sources of these rivers are on its southwestern slopes. It is rich in high-quality forest resources, especially coniferous and mixed (spruce - abies - beech) woods, with Bosnian endemic quarry mammals.

References

See also 
 Skender Vakuf
 Ugar
 Ilomska
 Cvrcka
 Jakotina

Mountains of Bosnia and Herzegovina